Genting Sempah or Sempah Pass is a transit town and mountain pass in Bentong District, Pahang, Malaysia. Genting Sempah is mostly known as a transit point to Genting Highlands which is a hill station located on peak of Mount Kali in Malaysia.

References

External links 
 http://thestar.com.my/news/story.asp?file=/2012/2/28/nation/10818332&sec=nation

Bentong District
Towns in Pahang